This was the first edition of the event.

Boris Becker and Patrik Kühnen won the title, defeating Shelby Cannon and Scott Melville 6–2, 6–4 in the final.

Seeds

  Tom Nijssen /  Cyril Suk (semifinals)
 N/A
  Hendrik Jan Davids /  Libor Pimek (quarterfinals)
  Diego Nargiso /  Javier Sánchez (quarterfinals)

Draw

Draw

References

External links
 Draw

Doubles